Nabis inscriptus is a species of damsel bug in the family Nabidae. It is found in Europe and Northern Asia (excluding China) and North America.

References

Further reading

 

Nabidae
Articles created by Qbugbot
Insects described in 1837